Taxigramma is a genus of satellite flies in the family Sarcophagidae. There are about 18 described species in Taxigramma.

Species
These 18 species belong to the genus Taxigramma:

T. albina (Rohdendorf, 1935) c g
T. aperta Rohdendorf, 1935 c g
T. armeniaca Verves, 1980 c g
T. biseta (Villeneuve, 1915) c g
T. elegantula (Zetterstedt, 1844) c g
T. gussakovskiji Rohdendorf, 1935 c g
T. heteroneura (Meigen, 1830) i c g b
T. hilarella (Zetterstedt, 1844)b
T. jagnobica Rohdendorf, 1935 c g
T. karakulensis (Enderlein, 1933) c g
T. kovalevi Verves, 1980 c g
T. multipunctata (Rondani, 1859) c g
T. pluriseta (Pandellé, 1895) c g
T. pluton Verves, 1984 c g
T. pseudaperta Séguy, 1941 c g
T. richteri (Rohdendorf, 1961) c g
T. stictica (Meigen, 1830) c g
T. zimini Rohdendorf, 1935 c g

Data sources: i = ITIS, c = Catalogue of Life, g = GBIF, b = Bugguide.net

References

Further reading

 

Sarcophagidae
Articles created by Qbugbot